Bancoult v. McNamara, 445 F.3d 427 (D.C. Cir. 2006), was a legal case in which Olivier Bancoult sued Robert McNamara, the former United States Secretary of Defense, challenging the removal of Chagosians from Diego Garcia when the United States of America built a military base in the British Indian Ocean Territory.  The Court of Appeals for the District of Columbia Circuit ruled that the case raised nonjusticiable political questions and dismissed the case.

See also
Political question doctrine

External links
 

2006 in United States case law
Chagos Archipelago sovereignty dispute
United States Court of Appeals for the District of Columbia Circuit cases